Khvorostyansky (masculine), Khvorostyanskaya (feminine), or Khvorostyanskoye (neuter) may refer to:
Khvorostyansky District, a district of Samara Oblast, Russia
Khvorostyanskoye, a rural locality (a village) in the Republic of Bashkortostan, Russia